Calypso is a genus of orchids containing one species, Calypso bulbosa, known as the calypso orchid, fairy slipper or Venus's slipper. It is a perennial member of the orchid family found in undisturbed northern and montane forests.  It has a small pink, purple, pinkish-purple, or red flower accented with a white lip, darker purple spottings, and yellow beard. The genus Calypso takes its name from the Greek signifying concealment, as they tend to favor sheltered areas on conifer forest floors.  The specific epithet, bulbosa, refers to the bulb-like corms.

Description

Calypso bulbosa is a deciduous, perennial, herbaceous tuberous geophyte with a round, egg-shaped tuber as a perennial organ. It is encased in dead leaf sheaths and has elongated roots. Calypso orchids are typically 8 to 20 cm in height. At the bottom there is only a single leaf, which is stalked up to about 7 cm long. The leaves are whole eliptical lanceolate to egg-shaped blade is up to 6 cm long and up to 5 cm wide.

Plant blooms with a purple-pink hermaphroditic, zygomorphic and threefold flower. The protruding petals and sepals  are pink to purple in color, about 10 to 12 millimeters long and about 2 to 4 millimeters wide. The lip (labellum) is white to pink with pink or yellow spots. It has a wide, shoe-shaped cavity in the back and is about 15 to 25 millimeters long. A spur is absent. They do not bloom until May and June usually after snow melt. Each bulb lives no more than five years.

Taxonomy and systematics
The chromosomes count is 2n = 28. Since the orchid seed does not provide any nutrient tissue, germination only takes place when infected by a Mycorrhizal root fungus.

Taxonomy
The generic name Calypso , which is still valid today. was described in 1806 by the English gardener Richard Anthony Salisbury (1761-1829) in the work "Paradisus Londinensis", which Salisbury with the then director of the Royal Botanic Gardens in London, William Jackson Hooker (1785-1865), published. Carl von Linné originally assigned the Calypso bulbosa to the genus Cypripedium in 1753. But Calypso and Cypripedium now belong to two different subfamilies.

The following generic names have been published as synonyms: 
 Cytherea  (1812)
 Orchidium  (1814)
 Calypsodium  (1829)
 Norna  (1833)

The valid botanical species name of the Calypso orchid is: Calypso bulbosa .

The Basionym Cypripedium bulbosum  was described by Linné in "Species Plantarum".

The species names listed here are used as synonyms: 

Varieties
Four natural varieties and one nothovariety (variety of hybrid origin but established in the wild) are recognized:

Distribution and ecology

This species' range is circumpolar, and includes California, the Rocky Mountain states and most of the most northerly states of the United States; most of Canada; Scandinavia much of European and Asiatic Russia;  China, Mongolia, Korea and Japan—see external links for map. It is found in subarctic swamps and marshes as well as shady places subarctic coniferous forests.

Although the calypso orchid's distribution is wide, it is very susceptible to disturbance, and is therefore classified as threatened or endangered in several U. S. states and in Sweden and Finland. It does not transplant well owing to its mycorrhizal dependence on specific soil fungi.  The corms have been used as a food source by North American native peoples.  The Nlaka'pamux of British Columbia used it as a treatment for mild epilepsy.

At least near Banff, Alberta, the calypso orchid is pollinated by bumble bees (Bombus (Pyrobombus) and B. Psithyrus).  It relies on "pollination by deception", as it attracts insects to anther-like yellow hairs at the entrance to the pouch and forked nectary-like structures at the end of the pouch but produces no nectar that would nourish them.  Insects quickly learn not to revisit it. Avoiding such recognition may account for some of the small variation in the flower's appearance.

References

External links
 
 
 Map of distribution
 Jepson Manual treatment of the species
 Wild orchid of Japan

Orchids of the United States
Plants described in 1753
Taxa named by Carl Linnaeus
Orchids of Canada
Orchids of Europe
Orchids of Asia
Orchids of Russia
Orchids of China
Calypsoinae
Plants used in Native American cuisine
Plants used in traditional Native American medicine
Flora without expected TNC conservation status